Walter De Donder (born 12 July 1960) is a Belgian actor and politician and is best known for parts in Flemish children's television series.

De Donder started in entertainment as an amateur and performed with a puppet called Bibberlip. His breakthrough came in 1989 when he was asked to play the role of De Burgemeester (the mayor) in children's TV show Samson en Gert. Through this role he was able to become a professional actor. In 1997 he took on the role of the title character in the children's series Kabouter Plop, produced by Studio 100. His roles as De Burgemeester and Kabouter Plop made him a celebrity both in Belgium and in the Netherlands.

He was a member of the cast of the satirical programme  ("Brussels News Street") that ran from 2000 to 2002. This programme also featured Koen Crucke, another veteran of Samson and Gert.

De Donder is active in the Flemish Christian Democrat party CD & V. In 2000 he was elected to Affligem local council in a coalition with N-VA, and he was reelected in the 2006 local elections. During party coalition talks, it was agreed that he would become mayor from 2011 and he took on this role on the first of January of that year. He was re-elected as mayor in 2012 and 2018. In 2019 he was an unsuccessful candidate in his party's leadership contest.

Filmography
Television
Samson en Gert (1989 – ) Mr. Mayor
F.C. De Kampioenen (F.C. The Champions) (1990) extra in the first season
F.C. de Kampioenen (F.C. The Champions) (2006) episode "Food Poisoning" as Inspecteur Kimpe

Kabouter Plop (1997 – ) television – Kabouter Plop
Brussel Nieuwsstraat]' (Brussels News Street) (2000) TV series – FlikUrban Zone (January 3, 2004) episode "Flight Crime"

FilmGod, Verdomme !? (God Damn !?) (1996)De Kabouterschat (The Gnome Treasure) (1999) – Kabouter PlopPlop in de Wolken (Plop in the Clouds) (2000) – Kabouter PlopPlop en de Toverstaf (Plop and the Magic Wand) (2003) – Kabouter PlopPlop en Kwispel (Plop and Kwispel) (2004) – Kabouter PlopPlop en het vioolavontuur (Plop and the Violin Adventure) (2005) - Kabouter PlopPlop in de stad (Plop in the city) (2006) – Kabouter PlopPlop en de Pinguïn (Plop and the Penguin) (2007) – Kabouter PlopSamson en Gert: Hotel op Stelten (Hotel on Stilts) (2008) – Mr. MayorPlop en de kabouterbaby'' (Plop and the gnome baby) (2009) – Kabouter Plop

Footnotes

External links

 

1960 births
Living people
Christian Democratic and Flemish politicians
Flemish male television actors
21st-century Flemish male actors
Belgian actor-politicians
Belgian Roman Catholics